Chris Mulkey (born May 3, 1948) is an American film and television actor.

Career
Mulkey played the supporting role of husband to Annie Potts's character in Any Day Now from 1998 to 2002. He has also appeared in Captain Phillips, Against the Wall, Cloverfield, the NBC TV movie Knight Rider, 24, Boardwalk Empire, Friday Night Lights, Boomtown, Justified, Baretta, and Twin Peaks.

He played the main character in the controversial 1985 Supertramp music video "Brother Where You Bound". He appeared in the Wing Commander franchise as Jacob "Hawk" Manley. He costarred with John Jenkins and Karen Landry in the 1988 indie film Patti Rocks.  He appeared in the science fiction action film The Hidden, and the 1989 sci-fi cop film K-9000. He has appeared in more recent films as The Purge, Slow Burn, Sanitarium, The Identical and On the Basis of Sex. In 2014, he had a cameo role in Whiplash.

His southern blues band is called Chris Mulkey and the Seekers.

Personal life
Mulkey was born in Viroqua, Wisconsin. He  was married to actress Karen Landry until her death in 2015.

Filmography

Film

Television

References

External links

Chris Mulkey Interview NAMM Oral History Library (2019)

1948 births
Male actors from Wisconsin
American male film actors
American male television actors
American male voice actors
20th-century American male actors
21st-century American male actors
Living people
People from Viroqua, Wisconsin